The 2015–16 Scottish Championship (referred to as the Ladbrokes Championship for sponsorship reasons) is the 21st season in the current format of 10 teams in the second tier of Scottish football.

Rangers won the league title and promotion after a 1–0 win against Dumbarton on 5 April 2016, while Alloa Athletic were relegated after a 0–0 draw against Livingston on 2 April 2016.

Teams
The following teams have changed division since the 2014–15 season.

To Championship

Promoted from Scottish League One
 Greenock Morton

Relegated from Scottish Premiership
 St Mirren

From Championship

Promoted to Scottish Premiership
 Heart of Midlothian

Relegated to Scottish League One
 Cowdenbeath

Stadia and locations

Personnel and kits

Managerial changes

a.Initially interim, made permanent 5 January 2016

League table

Results
Teams play each other four times, twice in the first half of the season (home and away) and twice in the second half of the season (home and away), making a total of 36 games.

First half of season

Second half of season

Season statistics

Scoring

Top scorers

Discipline

Player

Yellow cards

Red cards

Club

Yellow cards

Red cards

Attendances

Championship play-offs
Livingston, the second bottom team, entered into a 4-team playoff with the 2nd-4th placed teams in 2015–16 Scottish League One; Ayr United, Peterhead, and Stranraer.

Semi-finals

First leg

Second leg

Final
The winners of the semi-finals, Ayr United and Stranraer, competed against one another over two legs, with the winner, Ayr, replacing Livingston and being promoted to the 2016–17 Scottish Championship.

First leg

Second leg

References

Scottish Championship seasons
2015–16 Scottish Professional Football League
2
Scot